Agios Nikolaos is the Greek name of St Nicholas. As a place name, it may refer to:

Greece
 Agios Nikolaos, Glyfada, a luxury district in Glyfada, Athens
 Agios Nikolaos, village in the community Kallithea, Phocis
 Agios Nikolaos, Crete, a port town in Crete
 Agios Nikolaos (football club)
 Agios Nikolaos (Chania), an islet on the coast of Crete
 Agios Nikolaos, Messenia, a popular holiday village on the Mani Peninsula in southern Greece, Lefktro municipality
 Agios Nikolaos, village in the community Kounoupitsa in the Methana peninsula, Peloponnese
 Agios Nikolaos, Chalkidiki, part of the municipality Sithonia, Chalkidiki
 Agios Nikolaos, Corfu, a village southeastern Corfu
 Agios Nikolaos, Zakynthos, a village in the north of the island of Zakynthos
 Agios Nikolaos, an alternative name of Koiliomenos, a village in the south of the island of Zakynthos
 Agios Nikolaos, Voies, a village in the Voies municipal unit in Laconia
 Agios Nikolaos, a village in the Sminos municipal unit in Laconia
 Agios Nikolaos, Spata

Cyprus
Ayios Nikolaos, Famagusta a village in the Famagusta District
Agios Nikolaos Lefkas an abandoned village in the Nicosia District
Agios Nikolaos, Paphos a village in the Paphos District
Ayios Nikolaos, SBA a former village located in the Sovereign Base Area of Dhekelia
Ayios Nikolaos Station, a British military installation
Agios Nikolaos tis Stegis, a historic church near Kakopetria, Nicosia District